James Martin Hannett (31 May 1948 – 18 April 1991), initially credited as Martin Zero, was a British record producer, musician and an original partner/director at Tony Wilson's Factory Records. Hannett produced music by artists including Joy Division, the Durutti Column, Magazine, John Cooper Clarke, New Order, Orchestral Manoeuvres in the Dark and Happy Mondays. His distinctive production style embraced atmospheric sounds and electronics.

Early life
Born in Manchester, England, Hannett was raised in a working class, Catholic family in Miles Platting, Manchester; he attended Corpus Christi school and Xaverian College in Rusholme. In 1967, he went to the University of Manchester Institute of Science and Technology (UMIST), where he earned a degree in chemistry but chose not to pursue the profession.

Career
Hannett's uncle was a bass player and gave his nephew a bass guitar when he was 14. Hannett played bass with Spider Mike King and as member in a band called Paradox, in 1973, alongside Paul Young, later of Sad Café and Mike + The Mechanics.

Hannett's production work began with the animation film soundtrack All Kinds of Heroes, written by Steve Hopkins (with whom Hannett later worked again). By this time, he also began to mix live sound at pub gigs. Other early production works included Greasy Bear material, Belt & Braces Road Show Band's eponymous album in 1975 and five songs from Pete Farrow's repertoire recorded at Pennine Studios, Oldham, later included on Farrow's compilation album Who Says There's No Beach in Stockport. He attracted more musical attention in 1977, when, as Martin Zero, he produced the first independent punk record, Buzzcocks' Spiral Scratch EP. Under the same moniker he produced early records by punk poet John Cooper Clarke, whose Salford monotone was complemented by drum machines, simple synthesiser motifs and Hannett's bass playing. Jilted John's first single (titled "Jilted John") was Hannett's first hit single.

Hannett became closely associated with Joy Division; his production incorporated looping technology to treat musical notes with an array of filters, echoes and delays. Hannett had a collection of BBD echo devices which he called his "bluetop echo and delay boxes".

The Cargo Recording Studios in Rochdale were used for the recording of Digital, Glass, Atmosphere, Dead Souls and Ice Age. Hannett's unorthodox production methods resulted in drum sounds mixed with synthesisers that were complex and highly distinctive. According to Hannett: "There was a lot of space in [Joy Division's] sound. They were a gift to a producer, because they didn't have a clue. They didn't argue. A Factory Sample was the first thing I did with them. I think I'd had the new AMS delay line for about two weeks. It was called 'Digital'. It was heaven sent."

Hannett produced U2's first international single, "11 O'Clock Tick Tock", which was released in May 1980. He was set to produce their debut album, Boy, but after the suicide of Joy Division singer Ian Curtis, Hannett was too distraught to work and backed out.

A rift developed with Factory and he sued them in 1982 over various financial matters. The dispute was eventually settled out of court; the lawsuit is listed as part of the Factory Records catalogue as FAC61. When Hannett returned to produce the Happy Mondays he worked as a freelance producer and was not reinstated as a Factory director.

Personal life and death

After Factory, Hannett's career declined due to his heavy use of alcohol and drugs along with his girlfriend Susanne OHara, especially heroin; Hannett dumped Susanne OHara to get away from Heroin and Susanne's controlling ways and found a much more caring person Wendy, who he then married. Hannett's weight eventually reached 26 stone (165 kilograms, 364 pounds). Hannett died on 18 April 1991 at the age of 42 in Manchester, as a result of heart failure. He was survived by his wife Wendy, son James and stepdaughter Tania. His headstone at Southern Cemetery, Manchester pays him tribute as the creator of "The Manchester Sound".

Legacy
A film documentary about Hannett's life was released on DVD on the 23rd anniversary of his death on 10 April 2014. A book was released the same day, Martin Hannett – Pleasures of the Unknown by Chris Hewitt. Another book by Hewitt, Martin Hannett, His Equipment and Strawberry Studios, was published on 26 January 2016 to coincide with the 50th anniversary of Strawberry Recording Studios. Several weeks after his death, Factory Records released "Martin: The Work of Martin Hannett" (FACT325) as a tribute.

Hannett was portrayed by Andy Serkis in the 2002 film 24 Hour Party People, which was based on Tony Wilson's career as the co-founder of Factory Records and The Haçienda nightclub. In the DVD commentary, Wilson notes a review that described Hannett as Serkis' "strangest role" and points out that Serkis is best known for his portrayal of Gollum in Peter Jackson's The Lord of the Rings trilogy. Wilson concludes that the reviewer's implication is correct, that indeed, Hannett was far stranger than the Lord of the Rings character. Hannett was portrayed by Ben Naylor in Anton Corbijn's film Control (2007).

Selected discography

Albums produced

 Belt & Braces Road Show Band – Belt & Braces Road Show Band LP 1975 private pressing – rare- tracks issued on Hannett Maverick Producer compilation CD
 Pete Farrow, Who Says There's No Beach in Stockport? recorded 1977 issued 2001 on CD by Ozit Morpheus and on Maverick Producer Hannett compilation CD
 John Cooper Clarke – Disguise in Love 1978
 Jilted John – True Love Stories 1978
 The Durutti Column – The Return of the Durutti Column 1979
 Joy Division – Unknown Pleasures 1979
 Pauline Murray and the Invisible Girls – Pauline Murray and the Invisible Girls 1979
 Basement 5 – 1965–1980 and In Dub 1980
 John Cooper Clarke – Snap, Crackle & Bop 1980
 Joy Division – Closer 1980
 Magazine – The Correct Use of Soap 1980
 The Psychedelic Furs – The Psychedelic Furs 1980 (songs "Susan's Strange" and "Soap Commercial")
 Various Artists - A Factory Quartet 1980 - Three tracks by The Durutti Column and six by The Royal Family and the Poor. The double album on Factory Records also featured a side each from Kevin Hewick and Blurt 
 A Certain Ratio – To Each... 1981
 Joy Division – Still 1981
 Magazine – Magic, Murder and the Weather (1981) – mixed
 New Order – Movement 1981
 Section 25 – Always Now (1981)
 John Cooper Clarke – Zip Style Method (1982)
 The Names – Swimming (1982)
 Orchestre Rouge – Yellow Laughter 1982
 Armande Altaï – Nocturne Flamboyant (1983)
 Blue in Heaven – All the Gods Men (1985)
 The Stone Roses – The Martin Hannett album (1985) (Finally released as Garage Flower, coupled with the single "So Young" in 1996)
 Walk the Walk – Walk the Walk (1987)
 Happy Mondays – Bummed (1988)
 The High – Somewhere Soon (1990)
 Joy Division – Martin Hannett's Personal Mixes (2007)
 Joy Division – In the Studio with Martin Hannett (2008)
 Johnny and the Cold Demons – Walk the Walk (2014)

Singles and EPs produced

 Buzzcocks, Spiral Scratch 1976 as Martin Zero
 Slaughter and the Dogs, "Cranked Up Really High" 1977 as Martin Zero
 Jilted John, "Jilted John" 1978
 Joy Division, "Transmission" 1979
 Orchestral Manoeuvres in the Dark, "Almost" 1979 as Martin Zero
 A Certain Ratio, "Flight" 1979/1980
 A Certain Ratio, Do the Du EP 1980
 Kevin Hewick, "Haystack" 1980
 Joy Division, "Love Will Tear Us Apart" 1980
 Buzzcocks, Are Everything, Strange Thing 1980
 U2, "11 O'Clock Tick Tock" 1980
 Pauline Murray and the Invisible Girls, "Mr X" 1980
 Pauline Murray and the Invisible Girls, "Searching for Heaven" 1981
 Crispy Ambulance, "Live on a Hot August Night" 1981
 ESG, ESG 1981
 Kissing the Pink, "Don't Hide in the Shadows" 1981
 New Order, "Ceremony" 1981
 New Order, "Everything's Gone Green" 1981
 New Order, "Procession" 1981
 Minny Pops, "Dolphin's Spurt" 1981
 Tunnelvision, "Watching the Hydroplanes" 1981
 Stockholm Monsters, "Fairy Tales" 1981
 The Names, "Nightshift" 1980
 The Names, "Calcutta" 1981
 The Names, "The Astronaut" 1982
 Blue in Heaven, "Across My Heart" (version) 1984
 The Stone Roses, "So Young" / "Tell Me" 1985
 Kit, "Overshadowing Me" 1990
 Kitchens of Distinction, "Quick as Rainbows" 1990
 New Fast Automatic Daffodils, "Get Better" 1991
 World of Twist, "She's a Rainbow" 1991
 Wasted Youth, "Rebecca's Room" 1981
 Chris Sievey, “Camouflage” 1983

Compilations

 Martin: The Work of Martin Hannett (Factory Records, 1991)
 And Here is the Young Man (Debutante, 1998)
 Zero: A Martin Hannett Story 1977–1991''' (Big Beat, 2006)
 Martin Hannett- Maverick Producer, Genius and Musician'' 2-CD set ( Ozit Morpheus Records Sept 2011)
 Monsters In Stilettos.Various Artists Demos Including Judy Punchbag,The Pierce,The Basingstoke,Pyranees,Les Beians,George The Gorge,Auto Speed 6 and Devil Gate Drivers.

References

External links 
 Martin Hannett biography at LTM
 Interview with Jon Savage (last archived version)
 Martin Hannett page.
 The work of record producer Martin Hannett
  Martin Hannett explaining his production of Pauline Murray and the Invisible Girls' "The Visitor" song.
 A page about working with Martin in the early 1980s

1948 births
1991 deaths
Deaths from congestive heart failure
Alumni of the University of Manchester Institute of Science and Technology
Buzzcocks
English record producers
English male guitarists
Male bass guitarists
English new wave musicians
Musicians from Manchester
People from Miles Platting
Factory Records artists
Factory Records
20th-century English musicians
20th-century English bass guitarists
20th-century British male musicians
Burials at Southern Cemetery, Manchester
The Invisible Girls members